Coelogyne hirtella is an orchid endemic to Borneo.

References
The Internet Orchid Species Photo Encyclopedia

hirtella